Antonio Mariño Souto (known as Ñico) (born Havana, 16 September 1935) is a Cuban painter. and comics artist.

He graduated from the Concepción Arenal School in the Centro Gallego in Havana, Cuba, with a degree in plastic arts, and also has a degree in journalism.  He is a painter, graphic designer, and caricaturist, as well as a founding member of the National Union of Writers and Artists of Cuba ("UNEAC") and the Union of Journalists of Cuba. He is also a member of the Association of Plastic Artists of UNESCO ("AIAP") and the Latin American Association of Cartoonists

He has received 12 international awards and 83 national awards. He is the author of five humorous novels. His work has appeared in numerous publications, as well as national and international catalogues. He has judged national and international events involving journalism and the plastic arts.

Gallery at Wikimedia

Notes

External links
 Artist page at Medalia Arts

Living people
1935 births
20th-century Cuban painters
20th-century Cuban male artists
Cuban comics artists
Cuban cartoonists
20th-century Cuban artists
Male painters